DJ Friction may refer to:

DJ Friction (UK), British drum and bass DJ and producer
DJ Friction (Germany), German hip hop DJ and producer
DJ Friction (IN), Indian hip hop DJ owned by Sandeep Singh.